Mike Springston (born December 24, 1956) is an American football coach.

Coaching career
Springston was the head football coach for the West Virginia Tech Golden Bears located in Montgomery, West Virginia.  He held that position for four seasons, from 1999 until 2002.  His coaching record at West Virginia Tech was 16 wins and 25 losses.

References

1956 births
Living people
Charleston Golden Eagles football coaches
Eastern Kentucky Colonels football coaches
West Virginia Tech Golden Bears football coaches
High school football coaches in North Carolina